Chortkiv Air Base is a former Ukrainian Air Force installation located in Chortkiv, Chortkiv Raion, Ternopil Oblast, Ukraine.

The base was home to the:
 452nd Assault Aviation Brigade (previously 452nd Independent Assault Aviation Regiment) (452 OShAP)) (452 Shavbr) (Sukhoi Su-25) (1989-2004)
 236th Fighter-Bomber Aviation Regiment (APIB) between December 1954 and August 1984 of the 289th Fighter-Bomber Aviation Division (ADIB) of the 15th Air Army of the Carpathian Military District
 The unit flew the Mikoyan-Gurevich MiG-15 (NATO: Fagot), Mikoyan-Gurevich MiG-17 (NATO: Fresco), Mikoyan-Gurevich MiG-21 (NATO: Fishbed), Mikoyan-Gurevich MiG-23BM (NATO: Flogger) & Mikoyan MiG-27K (NATO: Flogger-J2)

References

Ukrainian airbases